Witold Leszek Kaczanowski alias Witold-K (Warsaw, May 15, 1932)  is a Polish-American artist.

He was born in Warsaw, Poland and studied at the Warsaw Academy of Fine Arts.

In 1964 he was sent to Paris by the Ministerstwo Kultury (Polish Ministry of Culture). He smuggled manuscripts of dissident writers from Poland and the Soviet Union into the West.

Witold-K received an award from The American Congress for the Freedom of Culture, in Paris in 1964. After receiving the award he was not allowed to return to Poland for many years. He moved to New York City in 1968.

In 1969 he relocated to California and briefly occupied the home of Abigail Folger and Wojciech Frykowski (both later murdered at 10050 Cielo Drive by the followers of Charles Manson), and opened his first studio/gallery in Beverly Hills. He also lived and worked in Santa Fe, New Mexico and Houston, Texas. Witold-K has been a resident of Denver, Colorado, since 1980.

References

External links
 Witold-K's website
 Witold-K exhibition of paintings in the Galeria Schody - 18.X.2013-15.XI.2013

Witold-K
Artists from Warsaw
Academy of Fine Arts in Warsaw alumni
Living people
1932 births